The consensus 1974 College Basketball All-American team, as determined by aggregating the results of four major All-American teams.  To earn "consensus" status, a player must win honors from a majority of the following teams: the Associated Press, the USBWA, The United Press International and the National Association of Basketball Coaches.

1974 Consensus All-America team

Individual All-America teams

AP Honorable Mention:

 Alvan Adams, Oklahoma
 Dan Anderson, USC
 Lloyd Batts, Cincinnati
 Leon Benbow, Jacksonville
 Willie Biles, Tulsa
 Lionel Billingy, Duquesne
 Junior Bridgeman, Louisville
 Gary Brokaw, Notre Dame
 Quinn Buckner, Indiana
 Luther Burden, Utah
 Tony Byers, Wake Forest
 Bill Campion, Manhattan
 Charles Cleveland, Alabama
 Adrian Dantley, Notre Dame
 Jesse Dark, VCU
 Leon Douglas, Alabama
 Louis Dunbar, Houston
 Darrell Elston, North Carolina
 Alex English, South Carolina
 Gus Gerard, Virginia
 Kevin Grevey, Kentucky
 Bernard Hardin, New Mexico
 Gene Harmon, Creighton
 Phil Hicks, Tulane
 Rich Kelley, Stanford
 Bruce King, Texas–Pan American
 Lon Kruger, Kansas State
 Ron Lee, Oregon
 Maurice Lucas, Marquette
 Walter Luckett, Ohio
 Clyde Mayes, Furman
 Sam McCants, Oral Roberts
 Eric Money, Arizona
 Allen Murphy, Louisville
 Coniel Norman, Arizona
 Frank Oleynick, Seattle
 Robert Parish, Centenary
 Cliff Pondexter, Long Beach State
 Larry Robinson, Texas
 Mike Robinson, Michigan State
 Phil Sellers, Rutgers
 Phil Smith, San Francisco
 Mike Sojourner, Utah
 Kevin Stacom, Providence
 Aron Stewart, Richmond
 Butch Taylor, Jacksonville
 Monte Towe, NC State
 Jan van Breda Kolff, Vanderbilt
 Fly Williams, Austin Peay
 Brian Winters, South Carolina

See also
 1973–74 NCAA Division I men's basketball season

References

NCAA Men's Basketball All-Americans
All-Americans